Barluzzi is an Italian surname. Notable people with the surname include:

Antonio Barluzzi (1884–1960), Italian architect
Dario Barluzzi (1935–2021), Italian footballer and manager

Italian-language surnames